Yoo Sang-hee is a former female badminton player from South Korea.

Yoo competed at the 1985 IBF World Championships, where she won the gold medal in mixed doubles with Park Joo-bong, and the bronze medal in women's doubles with Kim Yun-ja.  In 1988, Yoo retired from international badminton and married fellow 1985 World Champion Kim Moon-soo.

Achievements

World Championships 
Mixed doubles

References

External links
All England champions 1899-2007

South Korean female badminton players
Asian Games medalists in badminton
1964 births
Living people
Badminton players at the 1982 Asian Games
Badminton players at the 1986 Asian Games
Asian Games silver medalists for South Korea
Asian Games bronze medalists for South Korea
Medalists at the 1982 Asian Games
Medalists at the 1986 Asian Games